Eddie Melton (born 1981) is an American politician from the state of Indiana. A member of the Democratic Party, Melton serves in the Indiana Senate as the Senator for Indiana Senate District 3.  He also serves as Deputy Chair of the Indiana Democratic Party where he has focused on equity and inclusion.

Melton is from Gary, Indiana. He served on the Indiana State Board of Education. Melton was elected to the state senate in 2016. In June 2019, he announced his candidacy for governor of Indiana in the 2020 election. but he ended his candidacy in January 2020. In November 2020, Melton was elected as the Assistant Minority Floor Leader of the Indiana Senate.

References

External links
 Eddie Melton at Ballotpedia
 Project Vote Smart – Eddie Melton (IN) profile
 Our Campaigns – Eddie Melton (IN) profile
 Office website

Date of birth missing (living people)
Year of birth missing (living people)
21st-century American politicians
African-American state legislators in Indiana
School board members in Indiana
Democratic Party Indiana state senators
People from Merrillville, Indiana
Living people
Candidates in the 2020 United States elections
21st-century African-American politicians
20th-century African-American people
1981 births